"What's the Pressure" is a song performed by Belgian singer Laura Tesoro. The song represented Belgium in the Eurovision Song Contest 2016. The song was released as a digital download in Belgium on 17 January 2016 through VRT Line Extensions. It was ultimately placed tenth in the aforementioned competition with 181 points from the forty two voting nations.

Eurovision Song Contest

In November 2015, Tesoro was announced as one of the five participants of Eurosong 2016. In the first show, she covered the song "Düm Tek Tek" by Hadise, which represented Turkey in the Eurovision Song Contest 2009. In the second show she revealed her Eurovision candidate song and received the highest televoting score. In the final on 17 January 2016, she was declared the winner after placing first with both the Belgian public and international juries. Tesoro performed in position 1 with the song in the Eurovision Song Contest 2016, in Stockholm and finished tenth with 181 points;  six positions lower than the previous Belgian representative, Loïc Nottet.

Track listing

Charts

Weekly charts

Year-end charts

Certifications

Release history

References

English-language Belgian songs
Eurovision songs of Belgium
Eurovision songs of 2016
2015 songs
2016 singles
Laura Tesoro songs
Songs written by Selah Sue
Funk songs